The Lancia Lybra (Type 839) is a compact executive car manufactured and marketed by Fiat's premium division, Lancia  between 1998-2005, based on the Alfa Romeo 156 floorpan, and  replacing the Dedra in Lancia's range. Like the Dedra, the Lybra was available as a Berlina (saloon) or a Station Wagon (estate). A total of 164.660 units were made.

Name

The model's name refers to the zodiac sign of Libra, and signalled an end to Lancia's Greek letter model name convention. The Lybra was manufactured in the Rivalta plant near Turin until 2002 and after that in Mirafiori plant in Turin.

Styling

The Lybra was styled in Centro Stile Lancia, contrary to earlier Lancia models, which were commissioned from external design studios.   Initial models were carried out by Enrico Fumia in 1992 and by the time of His departure from Centro Stile Lancia the project was finished by Michael Robinson. The interior was designed by Flavio Manzoni.

The Lybra's distinctive taillights were given to the 2001 facelift of the Fiat Marea sedan for the Latin American markets.

Trim levels
At launch, standard trim levels were Lybra, LS and LX. In 2003, Business and LS Plus were added in some markets, Business have fabric seats, and wood decor in inside, LS Plus have Suhara or Madras upholstery and silver decor on the doors and the dashboard. The highest trim was called Emblema, presented for the first time in November 2002 at Bologna Motor Show. It was inspired by the classic Lancia Flaminia and came with tobacco brown leather interior (optional Alcantara), magnesium dashboard trim, exclusive 16 inch (10 spoke) alloy wheels, privacy glass and a gloss painted black roof.

Base model equipment: Electric front windows, 5" color display on the dashboard, Dual zone Climate control, rear vents for the A/C (one in the middle, and two on the bottom of the seats), ABS, EBD, 4 airbag (front and side), seatbelt pretensioner, electrically-adjustable door mirrors with electric heating, Electronic Lumbar Support and height adjustable driver seat, 4-way adjustable steering wheel, arm rest front (with Storage compartment) and rear (with cup holder), 5 three point seat belt and five headrest, ambient light in the bottom of the doors, and in inside, remote Key, FPS system. 15" wheels, 195/65 R15.

The optional equipments: GPS with GSM phone, electronic adjustable front seats, 4 electronic windows (up and down automatic), Electrochromatic Rearview mirror, Rain sensor, demister sensor, Leather, Alcantara or Suhara (after 15.12.2003) seats, electrically-adjustable door mirrors with fold function, sunroof, Cruise control, BOSE Sound System with 7 speakers, CD Changer (6 disc), AUX, 6 Airbag (2 front, 2 side, and 2 side curtain), three 180w Cigarette lighter socket, Xenon headlight, headlight washer, Nivomat self-levelling hydropneumatic rear suspension, fog lights, 60/40 Split Fold-Down Rear Seat (optional for Berlina and serie for SW), multifunction leather steering wheel and gear knob, ASR with Hill-holder (only for the 1.9 JTD, 2.0 20v, 2.4 JTD). 15" wheels 205/60 or 16" 205/55.

Business: Only in two colours (435 Blu Lancia and 612 Grigio Elisa Met), and two engines (1.6 16v or 1.9 JTD). Interior in basic grey cloth. Higher Trim level like than base model Lybra, added rear electric windows, 6 AirBag and fog light.

Emblema: Top of the range trim and available with 1.9 JTD, 2.4 JTD or 2.0 20v engines. Titanium trimmed console and interior details. Black roof option in SW (with black ‘railings’). Special 20-spoke 16” wheels. Interior trim could be chosen from beige leather, Alcantara or Suhara (after 15.12.2003) tobacco leather or tobacco Suhara.

Special editions

Two special editions were offered:

Executive: Featuring leather or Alcantara seats and rich equipment (demister sensor, sunroof, photocromatic rearview mirror, foldable side mirrors, heated seats, satellite navigation, GSM Phone, Cruise control, Xenon headlamp and headlamp washer, Nivomat rear suspension, Bose sound system), along with special 15-spoke 16” alloy wheels. Only two engines 2.0 20v petrol, and 2.4 JTD diesel.

Intensa: Intensa Edition with characteristic darkened grille, and darkened chrome around the outside, on the lights, license plate light cover, chrome stips on the bumpers and the doors, dark grey pentagram-shaped alloys. Exterior palette available also with an exclusive dark grey colour 'Grigio Fontana'. Inside the Intensa featured a combination of black leather and dark grey Alcantara seats with dark wood insert on the doors and the dashboard, chrome door handle, black background with chrome rings in the gauge cluster, chrome anchor point in the trunk and Bose sound system as standard. Only 4 engines are available, 1.8 (for Nedherlands), 1.9 JTD, 2.0 20v petrol, and 2.4 JTD.

Specifications 
The Lancia Lybra was a front-wheel drive car with transversely-mounted engines. The Lybra is available with a 5-speed manual, and the 2.0 L had an option of a 4-speed Aisin automatic transmission, called the Comfortronic by Lancia. 
Lybra utilises MacPherson struts at the front and BLG ("Bracci Longitudinali Guidati", translating to "Guided Longitudinal Arms") multilink rear suspension. Estate versions were also available with Boge-Nivomat self-levelling hydropneumatic rear suspension. Lybra uses four-wheel disk brakes, with front ventilated, ABS with EBD and optional ASR with hill-holder.

for Berlina/SW
*to 100km/h
**in g/km

With 2 persons and 40 kg luggage.

Sales 
The Lancia Lybra failed to meet its initial sales targets. These were set at 55,000 to 65,000 units per year.

The following are sales in Europe, which absorbed the majority of the vehicle's production:

References

Lybra
Compact executive cars
Mid-size cars
Sedans
Station wagons
Front-wheel-drive vehicles
2000s cars
Cars introduced in 1999